Guy Dupuis (born 4 September 1957) is a French former ice hockey player. He competed in the men's tournament at the 1988 Winter Olympics for France.

References

External links

1957 births
Living people
Boxers de Bordeaux players
Canadian emigrants to France
Diables Noirs de Tours players
French ice hockey centres
Milwaukee Admirals (IHL) players
Olympic ice hockey players of France
Ours de Villard-de-Lans players
Ice hockey players at the 1988 Winter Olympics
Sportspeople from Longueuil
Trois-Rivières Draveurs players